Niphoparmena kenyensis is a species of beetle in the family Cerambycidae. It was described by Stephan von Breuning in 1939.

It's 8 mm long and 2⅓ mm wide, and its type locality is Mount Kenya.

References

kenyensis
Beetles described in 1939
Taxa named by Stephan von Breuning (entomologist)